Heale is a surname. Notable people with the surname include:

Dominic Heale (born 1961), British journalist and newsreader
Gary Heale (born 1958), English footballer
Jimmy Heale (1914–1997), English footballer
Theophilus Heale (1816–1885), New Zealand politician
William Heale (1859–1907), English cricketer

See also
Heale Peak, mountain of Antarctica
Heal (disambiguation)